Geelan Ice Piedmont is an ice piedmont forming the northern end of Rothschild Island, off the coast of Antarctica. Following survey by the British Antarctic Survey, 1975–77, it was named by the UK Antarctic Place-Names Committee (UK-APC) for Patrick John Michael Geelan, who was Secretary of the Permanent Committee on Geographical Names, 1955–79, a member of the UK-APC from 1955, and Chairman of the UK-APC from 1992.

References

Ice piedmonts of Palmer Land